Westley Watende Omari Moore (born October 15, 1978) is an American politician, investment banker, author, television producer, and nonprofit executive serving as the 63rd governor of Maryland since 2023. A member of the Democratic Party, he is the first Black governor of the state, the third Black person elected as governor of any U.S. state, and as of 2023, the only incumbent black governor of any U.S. state. Moore is the fifth African American U.S. state governor overall following P. B. S. Pinchback of Louisiana, Douglas Wilder of Virginia, Deval Patrick of Massachusetts and David Paterson of New York.

Born in Maryland and raised largely in New York, Moore graduated from Johns Hopkins University and received a master's degree from Wolfson College, Oxford as a Rhodes Scholar. After several years in the U.S. Army and Army Reserve, Moore became an investment banker in New York. Between 2010 and 2015, Moore published five books, including a young adult novel. He served as CEO of the Robin Hood Foundation from 2017 to 2021. Moore is the author of The Other Wes Moore and The Work. He was also the host of Beyond Belief on the Oprah Winfrey Network, as well as the executive producer and a writer for Coming Back with Wes Moore on PBS.

Early life and education
Moore was born in Takoma Park, Maryland, to William Westley Moore Jr., a broadcast news journalist, and Joy Thomas Moore, a daughter of immigrants from Jamaica and a media professional.

On April 16, 1982, when Moore was three years old, his father died of acute epiglottitis. In the summer of 1984, Moore's mother took him and his two sisters to live in the Bronx, New York, with their grandparents. His grandfather, James Thomas, a Jamaican immigrant, was the first Black minister in the history of the Dutch Reformed Church. His grandmother, Winell Thomas, a Cuban who moved to Jamaica before immigrating to the U.S., was a retired schoolteacher. Moore attended Riverdale Country School. When his grades declined and he became involved in petty crime, his mother enrolled him in Valley Forge Military Academy and College.

In 1998, Moore graduated Phi Theta Kappa from Valley Forge with an associate degree, completed the requirements for the United States Army's early commissioning program, and was appointed a second lieutenant of Military Intelligence in the Army Reserve. He then attended Johns Hopkins University, where he studied international relations and economics and graduated Phi Beta Kappa and Omicron Delta Kappa in 2001. At Hopkins, Moore played wide receiver for the Johns Hopkins Blue Jays football team for two seasons. He was initiated into the Sigma Sigma Chapter of the Alpha Phi Alpha fraternity at Johns Hopkins in 2000. In 1998 and 1999, Moore interned for Baltimore Mayor Kurt Schmoke. He later became involved with the March of Dimes before serving in the Army. He also interned at the United States Department of Homeland Security under Secretary Tom Ridge. After graduating, he attended Wolfson College, Oxford as a Rhodes Scholar, where he earned a master's degree in international relations in 2004 and submitted a thesis titled Rise and Ramifications of Radical Islam in the Western Hemisphere. He was activated in the Army following the September 11 attacks, and deployed to Afghanistan from 2005 to 2006, attaining the rank of captain in the 82nd Airborne Division. He left the Army in 2014.

Career

In February 2006, Moore was named a White House Fellow to Secretary of State Condoleezza Rice. He later worked as an investment banker at Deutsche Bank in Manhattan and at Citibank from 2007 to 2012 while living in Jersey City, New Jersey. In 2009, Moore was included on Crain’s New York Business's "40 Under 40" list.

In 2010, Moore founded a television production company, Omari Productions, to create content for networks such as the Oprah Winfrey Network, PBS, HBO, and NBC. In May 2014, he produced a three-part PBS series, Coming Back with Wes Moore, which followed the lives and experiences of returning veterans.

In 2014, Moore founded BridgeEdU, a company that provided services to support students in their transition to college. Students participating in BridgeEdU paid $500 into the program with varying fees. BridgeEdU was not able to achieve financial stability and was acquired by student financial services company Edquity in 2019, mostly for its database of clients. A Baltimore Banner interview with former BridgeEdU students found that the short-lived company had mixed results.

In September 2016, Moore produced All the Difference, a PBS documentary that followed the lives of two young African-American men from the South Side of Chicago from high school through college and beyond. Later that month, he launched Future City, an interview-based talk show with Baltimore's WYPR station.

From June 2017 until May 2021, Moore was CEO of the Robin Hood Foundation, a charitable organization that attempts to alleviate problems caused by poverty in New York City. It works mainly through funding schools, food pantries and shelters. It also administers a disaster relief fund. During his tenure as CEO, the organization also raised more than $650 million, including $230 million in 2020 to provide increased need for assistance during the COVID-19 pandemic. Moore also sought to expand his advocacy to include America's poor and transform the organization into a national force in the poverty fight. Moore served on Under Armour's board of directors from September 2020 to November 2022, resigning from the board shortly after becoming governor-elect.

Books 
On April 27, 2010, Spiegel & Grau published his first book, The Other Wes Moore. The 200-page book explores the lives of two young Baltimore boys who shared the same name and race, but largely different familial histories that leads them both down very different paths. In December 2012, Moore announced that The Other Wes Moore would be developed into a feature film, with Oprah Winfrey attached as an executive producer. In September 2013, Ember published his second book, Discovering Wes Moore. The book maintains the message and story set out in The Other Wes Moore, but is more accessible to young adults. In April 2021, Unanimous Media announced it would adapt The Other Wes Moore into a feature film. As of June 2022, a film has yet to be produced.

In January 2015, Moore wrote his third book, The Work. In November 2016, he wrote This Way Home, a young adult novel about Elijah, a high school basketball player, who emerges from a standoff with a local gang after they attempt to recruit him to their basketball team, and he refuses. In March 2020, Moore and former Baltimore Sun education reporter Erica L. Green wrote Five Days: The Fiery Reckoning of an American City, which explores the 2015 Baltimore protests from the perspectives of eight Baltimoreans who experienced it on the front lines.

Political activities
Moore first expressed interest in politics in June 1996, telling a New York Times reporter that he planned to attend law school and enter politics after two years at Valley Forge. He told The Baltimore Sun in October 2022 that he felt the idea of holding elected office "only started to feel like a real possibility in 2020, when he was about to leave his job running Robin Hood".

Moore gave a speech at the 2008 Democratic National Convention, supporting Barack Obama for president. In 2013, he said that he had "no interest" in running for public office, instead focusing on his business and volunteer work. Later that year, Attorney General Doug Gansler said that he considered Moore as his running mate in the 2014 Maryland gubernatorial election, in which he ran with state delegate Jolene Ivey.

In April 2015, following the 2015 Baltimore protests, Moore said that the demonstrations in Baltimore were a "long time coming" and that Baltimore "must seize this moment to redress systemic problems and grow." Moore attended the funeral for Freddie Gray but left early to catch a plane to Boston for a speech he was giving on urban poverty. He later said he "felt guilty being away, but it wasn't just that. An audience in Boston would listen to me talk about poverty, but at a historic moment in my own city's history, I was MIA."

In October 2020, Moore was named to serve on the transition team of Baltimore mayor-elect Brandon Scott. In January 2021, Speaker of the Maryland House of Delegates Adrienne A. Jones consulted with Moore to craft her "Black agenda" to tackle racial inequalities in housing, health, banking, government, and private corporations.

Controversies
In June 2013, a Baltimore Sun investigation alleged that Moore was improperly receiving homestead property tax credits and owed back taxes to the city of Baltimore. Moore told The Sun that he was unaware of any issues with the home's taxes and wanted to pay what they owed immediately. In October 2022, Baltimore Brew reported that Moore had not paid any water and sewage charges since March 2021, owing $21,200 to the city of Baltimore. Moore settled his outstanding bills shortly after the article was published.

In April 2022, the family of Baltimore County Police Sergeant Bruce Prothero, whose murder in 2000 is highlighted in The Other Wes Moore, accused Moore of making contradictory statements about where the proceeds of the book went, saying that the family "directed no donations" to anywhere, including the nonprofits Moore named. The family also complained that Moore exaggerated his role in their son's life.

Moore was the subject of a CNN article in which he was accused of embellishing his childhood and where he actually grew up. Shortly after the article was published, Moore created a website that attempted to rebut the allegations. He was later criticized for failing to correct television interviewers who incorrectly said he was awarded a Bronze Star. A Capital News Service article highlighted Moore's connections to various industries, including pharmaceutical, technology, beauty and retail giants, and the Green Thumb Industries marijuana company. Moore left Green Thumb Industries in March 2022, and said in October that he would use a blind trust to hold his assets and resign from every board position if elected governor. As of February 2023, Moore has not finalized his trust.

Governor of Maryland

Elections

2022

In February 2021, Moore announced he was considering a run for governor of Maryland in the 2022 election. He launched his campaign on June 7, 2021, emphasizing "work, wages, and wealth" and running on the slogan "leave no one behind". His running mate was Aruna Miller, a former state delegate who represented Maryland's 15th district from 2010 to 2019.

During the primary, Moore was endorsed by House Majority Leader Steny Hoyer, Prince George's County executive Angela Alsobrooks, television host Oprah Winfrey, and former Governor Parris Glendening. He also received backing from the Maryland State Education Association and VoteVets.org.

On April 6, 2022, Moore filed a complaint with the Maryland State Board of Elections against the gubernatorial campaign of John King Jr., accusing "an unidentified party" of anonymously disseminating "false and disparaging information regarding Wes Moore via electronic mail and social media in an orchestrated attempt to disparage Mr. Moore and damage his candidacy." The complaint also suggested that King "may be responsible for this smear campaign", which the King campaign denied.

Moore won the Democratic primary on July 19, 2022, defeating former Democratic National Committee chairman Tom Perez and Comptroller Peter Franchot with 32.4% of the vote. During the general election, Moore twice campaigned with U.S. President Joe Biden. He also campaigned on reclaiming "patriotism" from Republicans, highlighting his service in the U.S. Army while also bringing attention to Republican nominee and state delegate Dan Cox's participation in the January 6 United States Capitol attack. Moore defeated Cox in the general election, and became Maryland's first Black governor and the first veteran to be elected governor since William Donald Schaefer.

In December 2022, Moore was elected to serve as finance chair of the Democratic Governors Association.

Tenure 

Moore was sworn in on January 18, 2023. He took the oath of office on a Bible owned by abolitionist Frederick Douglass, as well as his grandfather's Bible. The morning before his inauguration, Moore participated in a wreath-laying ceremony at the Kunta Kinte-Alex Haley Memorial at the Annapolis City Dock to "acknowledge the journey" that led to his becoming the third elected Black governor in U.S. history. Later that night, he held a celebratory event at the Baltimore Convention Center.

Cabinet 
Moore began announcing nominations for his 26-member cabinet on November 14, 2022. According to The Baltimore Banner, he assembled his cabinet at a slower pace than previous Maryland governors. 

Eleven of Moore's cabinet nominees are women and eleven are people of color. His nominees have mixed experience in government, social entrepreneurship, and philanthropy. Three of them, Secretary of Emergency Management Russell Strickland, Maryland State Police superintendent Roland Butler, and Secretary of Public Safety and Correctional Services Carolyn Scruggs, are holdovers from the Hogan administration.

As his chief of staff, Moore chose Fagan Harris, who co-founded the Baltimore Corps organization with Moore a decade ago. Moore also named three members of the Maryland General Assembly to his administration: state senator Paul G. Pinsky as Director of the Maryland Energy Administration; state senator Susan C. Lee as Secretary of State; and House of Delegates Majority Leader Eric Luedtke as chief legislative officer. Other notable Cabinet nominations included Salisbury mayor Jacob R. Day as Secretary of Housing and Community Development, former New York City Department of Correction commissioner Vincent Schiraldi as Secretary of Juvenile Services, Anthony Woods as Secretary of Veterans Affairs, and former WMATA general manager Paul Wiedefeld as Secretary of Transportation.

Political positions
During an August 2006 interview with C-SPAN, Moore said he identified as a "social moderate and strong fiscal conservative". In September 2022, he reiterated his position on fiscal issues as being "fiscally responsible". During his gubernatorial campaign, he was described as center-left, as well as progressive.

Moore has cited Jared Polis, Parris Glendening, and Roy Cooper as his political role models.

Crime and policing
Moore supports hiring more probation and parole officers, pursuing police misconduct allegations, and increasing resources for law enforcement agencies. In February 2022, he unveiled a public safety plan that includes improving offender services, improving police diversity, and supporting and funding community-based policing and violence intervention programs. Moore says he "believes in policing with maximum accountability and appropriate intensity", and would provide funding for community-based violence intervention programs to address violent crime. In an interview with MSNBC on August 30, 2022, Moore said that he would tackle crime in Baltimore by investing in violence intervention programs like Safe Streets and We Our Us. In September 2022, Moore said he would use the "bully pulpit" of the governor's office to help recruit officers and would give the state's Fraternal Order of Police a seat at the table, telling The Washington Post, "I don't think that you can be serious about actually implementing reforms if the agencies that have to be reformed are not part of the process."

In May 2022, Moore called on Governor Larry Hogan to target state resources toward preventing gun violence in Baltimore. He has campaigned on addressing crime in the city through better cooperation between the city and state, and to leverage these relationships on the federal level to bring more resources into the city. In January 2022, Moore told CBS News that he supported a bill that would prohibit charging juveniles with felony murder.

In January 2023, following the release of videos capturing the arrest and police assault of Tyre Nichols, Moore condemned the brutality of the police and thanked the U.S. Department of Justice for opening an investigation into Nichols's death. He later said in an interview that Nichols's death only highlighted the need to tackle injustice head-on.

In February 2023, Moore pledged $11 million in funding for the Maryland Coordination and Analysis Center, an agency that serves as a data-sharing platform for law enforcement officials across the state. He also said that his administration would not use a quota system for traffic stops and arrests after a Baltimore Banner investigation found that Maryland State Police supervisors previously demanded troopers hit targets for traffic stops and arrests.

Development initiatives

As governor, Moore is a member of the Maryland Board of Public Works—a constitutionally appointed body that oversees many aspects of the state's finances—along with the comptroller and the state treasurer. During his first board meeting in January 2023, Moore said the state would work to include more diverse businesses in state contracts.

In December 2022, Moore said he supported bringing the new Federal Bureau of Investigation headquarters to Prince George's County, calling it a "personal priority". In March 2023, Moore joined Democratic members of Maryland's congressional delegation and Prince George's County Executive Angela Alsobrooks in co-signing a letter to President Joe Biden asking him to get involved in the FBI's headquarters selection process.

In February 2023, Moore announced a $600 million five-year partnership with the Baltimore Orioles to develop properties around Camden Yards. He also introduced the Innovation Economy Infrastructure Act, which would provide $10 million in grants for "infrastructure projects in eligible technology sectors", and the Broadband Expansion Act, to offer tax incentives to the broadband internet industry. Later that month, Moore said he would scrap the Maryland Aviation Administration's controversial contract process to run concessions operations at the Baltimore/Washington International Airport; in March, he promised to include a "labor peace" agreement in future BWI concessions operations contracts.

Education
Moore supports the Blueprint for Maryland's Future reform effort, testifying before the state legislature to urge its passage. During his campaign, he said that he would "work closely with local governments to make sure they are on board with their commitments to the Blueprint". In September 2022, Moore said he would institute universal pre-K and apprenticeship and trade programs in schools, and promised increases for school construction, educator wages, after-school programs, tutoring, child care, and early childhood education. In his first budget in January 2023, Moore proposed allocating $500 million toward funding the Blueprint.

Moore does not support the expansion of charter schools, saying that he wants to focus on improving public school districts, but wants to ensure accountability for current charters. In his first budget, in January 2023, Moore cut funding for the state's Broadening Options and Opportunities for Students Today (BOOST) program to provide scholarships to students attending charter schools by $2 million, and introduced new eligibility limits for current BOOST students and their siblings. In an interview with Jewish Insider, Moore said he intended to get rid of the BOOST program in a few years, adding, "The focus that I have, the focus that our administration is going to have, is making sure that we are creating and developing world-class public schools for our students."

Moore supports creating a "service year option" in schools, which would enable high school graduates to do a gap year "in exchange for job training, mentorship, and other support including compensatory tuition at a state college or university." On January 19, 2023, Moore signed an executive order creating the Maryland Department of Service and Civic Innovation, a cabinet-level agency responsible for establishing a service-year option for all high school graduates. In February, he introduced the SERVE Act to create the "service year option program", which would pay young people $15 per hour for at least 30 hours a week for work in service to the community.

In November 2022, Moore called the cancellation of $20,000 in federal student loan debt a "good first step" and said he would push the Biden administration to forgive more federal student debt if elected governor.

Environment
During his campaign, Moore criticized the Hogan administration for a "failure of executive leadership" on fighting climate change. He supports the renewable energy goals set by the state's Clean Energy Jobs Act of 2019, which called for a 50% reduction in greenhouse gas emissions and an electrification of the state's vehicle fleet by 2030, and has said the state should pursue "more ambitious goals" beyond carbon neutrality. He has proposed regulations to achieve 100% clean energy use by 2035 and net zero carbon emissions by 2045, electrify the state's fleet, and prioritize environmental-justice funding. He also said that he would establish a "cap-and-invest" program in Maryland, which could tax polluters to provide revenue for clean energy infrastructure and relief in communities of color. Moore also said he would support Chesapeake Bay restoration efforts by promoting "accountability and enforcement" in Maryland, as well as in neighboring states, use federal funds to upgrade water and wastewater systems, and by increasing the number of environmental inspectors.

In April 2022, Moore signed a Chesapeake Climate Action Network pledge to support legislation to get Maryland to use 100 percent carbon-free electricity by 2035 and to remove trash incineration from the state's "clean energy" classification.

In October 2022, Moore told Lancaster Farming that he would support farmers by eliminating burdensome regulations, preserving farmland, and giving farmers technical assistance and financial resources. He also said he would develop a plan to accelerate projects improve water quality and cut carbon emissions in his administration's first 100 days, and supported the restoration of the state's Chesapeake Bay Restoration Fund.

On January 19, 2023, Moore signed an executive order releasing $9 million in funding for various clean energy projects in the state.

In February 2023, Moore introduced the Clean Transportation and Energy Act, which increases incentives for people and businesses looking to purchase electric trucks and charging stations. In March 2023, Moore said he supported adopting California's Advanced Clean Cars II (ACC II) regulation, which would phase out the sale of gas-powered cars in the state by 2035.

Health care
In January 2023, Moore proposed providing members of the Maryland National Guard with free health and dental care. In February 2023, he said he supported a bill that would require emergency rooms to include fentanyl testing in toxicology screens.

Housing
Moore supports the right to counsel in eviction cases, saying that providing tenants with access to counsel is "the just thing to do and it is the right thing to do". On his campaign website, Moore says he would address the "unfair appraisal values in historically redlined neighborhoods" and provide increased funding for the Maryland Department of Housing and Community Development.

Gun control

In 2022, Moore supported a bill to ban the possession and sale of ghost guns in Maryland. He supports creating a firearms database to help law enforcement track guns used in crimes. In June 2022, Moore condemned the Supreme Court's ruling in New York State Rifle & Pistol Association, Inc. v. Bruen, calling it a "misguided and dangerous decision." He also opposed Governor Hogan's decision to suspend the state's "good and substantial reason" standard for obtaining a concealed carry permit following the ruling.

In January 2023, Moore attended a Moms Demand Action rally in Annapolis, Maryland, where he said he would support legislation to regulate how firearms can be carried and stored.

Marijuana
Moore supported legislation introduced and passed during the 2022 legislative session that created a ballot referendum to legalize recreational marijuana in Maryland, and another bill that would regulate marijuana possession should the referendum pass in November. During his campaign, he has talked about implementing a recreational cannabis industry with a focus on equity "so that communities that have experienced the greatest disparities benefit the most." In October 2022, Moore praised President Joe Biden's pardon of thousands of people convicted of marijuana possession under federal law, and said that he would "fight to expunge the records of those arrested for marijuana possession [as governor]".

In January 2023, Moore signed an executive order releasing $46.5 million to start developing the framework for a recreational marijuana industry in the state, with a majority of the released funds going toward grants for minority-owned firms.

Minimum wage
During his campaign, Moore said that he would accelerate the state's incremental increase to a minimum wage of $15 an hour by 2023. He also supports indexing the state's minimum wage to inflation. At the beginning of the 2023 legislative session, Moore introduced the Fair Wage Act, a bill that would accelerate the state's minimum wage build-up to reach $15 an hour by October 2023 and index the minimum wage to the consumer price index starting in July 2025, with increases capped at five percent per year. The Senate Finance Committee amended the bill to remove provisions linking it to the consumer price index and delayed the wage increase until January 1, 2024. Moore also allocated $218 million in his first budget to support state service providers in keeping up with the accelerated wage increase.

Social issues

In September 2010, Moore testified in support of reauthorizing the Temporary Assistance for Needy Families federal assistance program. In July 2021, Moore opposed Governor Hogan's decision to end expanded federal unemployment benefits provided by the American Rescue Plan Act of 2021 early. In December 2022, Moore said he supported indexing the state's maximum unemployment insurance payment to inflation.

In June 2021, Moore opposed voter-ID legislation introduced by state senator Justin Ready, calling it "voter suppression". In September 2022, Moore said he opposed a lawsuit filed by state delegate Dan Cox against the Maryland State Board of Elections to block the early counting of Maryland's mail-in ballots in the 2022 elections, alleging that Cox was trying to sow distrust and uncertainty in the electoral system.

In 2022, Moore said he supported the Inclusive Schools Act, a bill introduced in the 2022 legislative session that bans schools from discriminating against students based on their sexual orientation and gender identity. He also supported the Trans Health Equity Act, a bill that would have required the state's Medicaid program to cover gender-affirming treatment. In December 2022, Moore praised the signing of the Respect for Marriage Act, which codifies same-sex and interracial marriage rights.

In June 2022, following the Supreme Court's ruling in Dobbs v. Jackson Women's Health Organization, Moore said that he would support an amendment to the Maryland Constitution to enshrine abortion access. He also pledged to release $3.5 million in funding for the Abortion Care Access Act, a bill passed in the 2022 legislative session that would expand the types of medical professionals who can perform abortions in Maryland, on his first day in office. On January 19, 2023, Moore signed his first executive order releasing $3.5 million in funding for training healthcare providers in abortion care under the Abortion Care Access Act. In February 2023, Moore said he supported a package of bills aimed at protecting abortion rights in the state, including a 2024 constitutional referendum to enshrine the right to abortion access. He also joined the Reproductive Freedom Alliance, a national network led by California Governor Gavin Newsom intended to strengthen abortion access in member states.

In August 2022, Moore supported protests led by veterans at the United States Capitol to pass the Honoring our PACT Act of 2022, which would provide benefits for veterans exposed to burn pits and other toxic phenomena.

During his gubernatorial campaign, Moore said he supported establishing a state "baby bonds" program, which would cost roughly $100 million per year and be seeded with $3,200 for every child born on Medicaid, to target the racial wealth gap. If enacted, it would be the largest baby bond program ever enacted in the United States.

In December 2022, Moore attended the Jewish Community Relations Council of Greater Washington's legislative breakfast, where he said he would be "very aggressive" in promoting trade between Maryland and Israel and promised that one of his first overseas visits would be to Israel.

Taxes
During his tenure as CEO of the Robin Hood Foundation, Moore pushed for New York legislators and Governor Andrew Cuomo to expand the state's child tax credit, and lobbied for the issue to be mentioned in Cuomo's State of the State speech.

During his campaign, Moore repeatedly expressed that he does not anticipate raising taxes as governor, but said in September 2022 that he planned to work with the legislature to fix what he described as the state's "upside-down taxation system".

In May 2022, Moore supported staving off automatic increases to the state's gas tax, arguing that voters needed immediate relief. In September 2022, Moore told the Maryland Family Network that he would support child care programs by subsidizing the service through tax credits for low-income families. He also expressed interest in eliminating either the state's estate or inheritance tax to make the state more attractive to retirees.

In his first budget in January 2023, Moore allocated $171 million toward making permanent the earned income tax credit passed by lawmakers in 2021, and $33 million for expanding tax exemptions for military retirement income.

Transportation
Moore opposed Governor Hogan's decision to cancel the Red Line, and said during his campaign that he supported restarting the rail project. During his campaign, he called for an "intermodal Red Line, that is built quickly, cost-effectively, and with community input on stops, disruptions, and impact on local businesses". In November 2022, Moore said he would support creating a regional transit authority for working on projects.

Moore does not support Governor Hogan's plan to widen portions of the Capital Beltway and Interstate 270 using high-occupancy toll lanes, saying that he would instead support a transit line alongside I-270 and a proposed transit line from Prince George's County to Charles County. Critics have accused Moore of flip-flopping on this stance after he told the Maryland Transit Opportunities that he would be willing to dedicate federal funds to the project, issuing a statement afterwards saying that he would be open to toll lanes if there were strong public consensus. In a radio interview with WAMU in July 2022, Moore said he preferred a "new type of proposal" for the I-270 toll lanes plan that included reversible lanes, increased transit, and greater collaboration with local "stakeholders."

In December 2022, Moore said he would view all transportation issues, including the I-270 and I-495 expansion efforts, through a "lens" of equity, environmental protection, and local partnership.

In his first budget in January 2023, Moore proposed allocating $500 million toward unspecified transportation projects. When asked by the Capital Gazette if this money would be used for the Red Line, Moore said that he had spoken with federal officials about restarting the line and that he did not want to "start from scratch". He also said he planned to use federal funds and public-private partnerships in transportation projects, including the Purple and Red lines.

Personal life

Moore and his wife, Dawn (née Flythe), moved to the Riverside community in Baltimore in 2006. The couple married on July 6, 2007. They have two children, Mia (born 2011) and James (born 2014). In February 2023, Moore adopted a dog named Tucker, a shih-poo, from a local animal shelter.

The Moores moved out of their Riverside home by late 2008, purchasing a home for $1.2 million in the Guilford community in north Baltimore and keeping their Riverside home as a rental before selling it in February 2021. They reside in Government House, the official residence of the Maryland governor and First Family in Annapolis, Maryland.

Military decorations and badges 
Moore's decorations and medals include:

Electoral history

Bibliography 
 The other Wes Moore : one name, two fates, New York : Spiegel & Grau, 2010. 
 The maker, North Carolina : Provectus Media, 2011. 
 Discovering Wes Moore : My Story, New York : Ember (Random House), 2013. 
 The work : searching for a life that matters, New York : Spiegel & Grau, 2015. 
Wes Moore; Shawn Goodman, This way home, New York : Delacorte Press, 2015. 
 Wes Moore; Erica L Green, Five days : the fiery reckoning of an American city, New York : One World, 2020.

See also 
List of minority governors and lieutenant governors in the United States

References

External links

The Office of Governor Wes Moore official government website
Wes Moore for Maryland campaign website

|-

|-

|-
 
|-

1978 births
21st-century American businesspeople
21st-century American male writers
21st-century American non-fiction writers
African-American male writers
African-American state governors of the United States
African-American United States Army personnel
Alumni of Wolfson College, Oxford
American Rhodes Scholars
American chief executives
American football wide receivers
American nonprofit chief executives
American politicians of Cuban descent
American politicians of Jamaican descent
American veterans activists
Businesspeople from Maryland
Democratic Party governors of Maryland
Johns Hopkins Blue Jays football players
Johns Hopkins University alumni
Living people
Military personnel from Maryland
Riverdale Country School alumni
Players of American football from Maryland
United States Army personnel of the War in Afghanistan (2001–2021)
Valley Forge Military Academy and College alumni
White House Fellows